Oxyaporia is a genus of parasitic flies in the family Tachinidae.

Species
Oxyaporia argentina (Brèthes, 1922)
Oxyaporia ornata (Brauer & von Bergenstamm, 1889)

References

Exoristinae
Diptera of South America
Tachinidae genera
Taxa named by Charles Henry Tyler Townsend